Straight Life is an album by American jazz organist Jimmy Smith featuring performances recorded in 1961 but not released on the Blue Note label until 2007.

Reception
The AllMusic review by Al Campbell awarded the album 3½ stars stating

Track listing
All compositions by Jimmy Smith except as indicated
 "Straight Life" – 5:09
 "Stuffy" (Coleman Hawkins) – 5:09
 "Stardust" (Hoagy Carmichael, Mitchell Parish) – 6:03
 "Sweet Sue, Just You" (Will Harris, V. Young) – 4:52
 "Minor Fare" – 5:39
 "Swanee" (Irving Caesar, George Gershwin) – 2:28
 "Jimmy's Blues" – 5:43
 "Yes Sir, That's My Baby" (Walter Donaldson, Gus Kahn) – 4:59
 "Here's to My Lady" (Rube Bloom, Johnny Mercer) – 4:55
 "Minor Fare" [alternate take] – 5:15
Recorded at Rudy Van Gelder Studio in Englewood Cliffs, New Jersey on June 22, 1961

Personnel

Musicians
 Jimmy Smith – organ
 Quentin Warren – guitar
 Donald Bailey – drums

Technical
 Alfred Lion – producer
 Rudy Van Gelder – engineer
 Francis Wolff – photography

References

Blue Note Records albums
Jimmy Smith (musician) albums
2007 albums
Albums produced by Alfred Lion
Albums recorded at Van Gelder Studio